Jules Archer (January 27, 1915 – November 13, 2008) was an American author who wrote many volumes of non-fiction history for a general audience and for young adults.
Archer attended DeWitt Clinton High School in New York City and the College of the City of New York, where he received a degree in advertising.

Archer served four years during World War II with the Army Air Forces in the Pacific theater. He was the author of many books on U.S. history, political events, and personalities, including The Plot to Seize the White House: The Shocking True Story of the Conspiracy to Overthrow FDR, and Jungle Fighters: A G.I. War Correspondent's Experiences in the New Guinea Campaign.

Jules Archer lived the remainder of his life in Scotts Valley, California. His papers are held by the University of Oregon Libraries.

Works (partial list) 

Battlefield President Dwight D. Eisenhower
Fighting Journalist Horace Greeley
Front-Line General Douglas MacArthur
Man of Steel Joseph Stalin, Julian Messner 1965
Twentieth Century Caesar Benito Mussolini
Angry Abolitionist William Loyd Garrison, Julian Messner 1969
The Philippines' Fight for Freedom, Crowell-Collier Press 1970, 
Treason in America: Disloyalty Versus Dissent, E P Dutton 1971, 
Ho Chi Minh: Legend of Hanoi, Bailey Bros.& Swinfen Ltd 1973, 
They Made a Revolution, 1776, 1975
The Plot to Seize the White House, 1973/2007
Mexico and the United States, 1973
The Incredible Sixties: The Stormy Years That Changed America, 1986
 Who's Running Your Life?: A Look at Young People's Rights, Harcourt Brace Jovanovich 1979, 
Resistance, 1973
They Had a Dream: The Civil Rights Struggle, 1993
Winners and Losers: How Elections Work in America, 1984
Mao Tse-Tung, 1972
 Breaking Barriers: The Feminist Revolution from Susan B. Anthony to Margaret ..., 1998
 You Can't Do That to Me: Famous Fights for Human Rights, 1980,

References

20th-century American historians
Historians of the United States
American non-fiction children's writers
American military writers
American political writers
American male non-fiction writers
United States Army Air Forces soldiers
United States Army Air Forces personnel of World War II
City College of New York alumni
DeWitt Clinton High School alumni
People from Scotts Valley, California
1915 births
2008 deaths
20th-century American male writers
Historians from New York (state)
Historians from California